Kadino Selo is a village in Municipality of Prilep, North Macedonia. Macedonian-born Bulgarian revolutionary Metody Patchev died here and is buried in the local church.

History
During the Ottoman Empire era, Kadino Selo was famous for its grapes harvesting and apple farms. The Battle of Kadino Selo which occurred in March 1902, was one that involved the local population including rebels from the IMRO against a large force of Ottoman Turkish soldiers.

Demographics
According to the 2002 census, the village had a total of 269 inhabitants. Ethnic groups in the village include:

Macedonians 269

References

Villages in Prilep Municipality